The 2014–15 Nemzeti Bajnokság III  began on August 16, 2014 and ended on June 30, 2015. 48 teams are competing in the season, divided into 3 groups. The 3 winners of the groups are promoted to NB II, while the teams from 14th to 16th and the worst 13th are relegated to Megyei Bajnokság I.

Changes from 2013-14
Teams relegated from NB II to NB III:
 Kisvárda Master Good
 Kozármisleny SE
 FC Tatabánya

Teams promoted to NB II from NB III:
 Soroksár SC champion of the Central group
 Szeged 2011 best runner-up (instead of Létavértes SC) 
 Csákvári TK champion of the Western group

Relegated form NB III to County Championship:
 Komlói Bányász SK
 Körmendi FC
 Ferencvárosi TC II
 Ebes KKSE
 Egri FC disqualified

Teams promoted to NB III from County Championship:
 Gyöngyösi AK
 Jászberényi FC
 Salgótarjáni BTC
 Veresegyház VSK stayed in NB III (due to lack of lower teams with NB III licence)
 Vác FC
 Maglódi TC stayed in NB III (due to lack of lower teams with NB III licence)
 Bölcskei SE stayed in NB III (due to lack of lower teams with NB III licence)
 Szegedi Egységes Oktatási Labdarúgó SC
 Szentlőrinc SE
 III. Kerületi TUE
 Diósdi TC stayed in NB III (due to lack of lower teams with NB III licence)
 Tököl VSK stayed in NB III (due to lack of lower teams with NB III licence)
 Sárvári FC

Teams

Eastern group
Following is the list of clubs competing in 2014–15 Nemzeti Bajnokság III - Eastern Group, with their location and stadium.

Central group
Following is the list of clubs competing in 2014–15 Nemzeti Bajnokság III - Central Group, with their location and stadium.

Western group
Following is the list of clubs competing in 2014–15 Nemzeti Bajnokság III - Western Group, with their location and stadium.

Personnel

Eastern group

Central group

Western group

Managerial changes

Standings

Eastern group

Central group

Western group

References

External links
  
 Western
 Central
 Eastern

2014–15 in European third tier association football leagues
2014-15
2014–15 in Hungarian football